Tasman Cargo Airlines Pty. Limited is a cargo airline based in Sydney, Australia. It operates scheduled international cargo services on behalf of DHL and ad hoc domestic and international cargo charters. Its corporate headquarters are at Sydney Kingsford Smith Airport in the Sydney suburb of Mascot. One of the aircraft is a Boeing 767 which is based at Auckland Airport in New Zealand.

History
Tasman Cargo Airlines commenced operations as Premier Airlines on 5 September 1994, headquartered in Melbourne, Victoria and flying a Boeing 727-100 freighter on behalf of DHL. Due to International Civil Aviation Organization "Stage III" aircraft noise restrictions this aircraft was withdrawn from service the following year and a Boeing 727-200 was acquired. In late 1996 Premier Airlines changed its name to Asian Express Airlines to better reflect its role in flying for DHL in the Asian region, and moved its headquarters to Auckland Airport. The airline's domicile in New Zealand was short-lived; it was established at its current location by early 1998.

On 1 October 2008 the airline changed its name from Asian Express Airlines to the current Tasman Cargo Airlines. In 2010 the airline leased a Boeing 757-200PCF freighter from DHL Air UK, pending acquisition of its own 757. The leased aircraft replaced the airline's previously-operated Boeing 727-200 freighter, retired on 31 August 2010 ahead of new Australian aircraft noise regulations taking effect the following day. This was the last Boeing 727 registered in Australia.

As it has operated only one aircraft the airline has used other operators' aircraft when its own was scheduled for maintenance. These other operators have included Pel-Air, Transmile Air Services and HeavyLift Cargo Airlines.

Tasman's 757 was replaced by a B767-300F in July 2018.

Destinations
Tasman Cargo Airlines operates regular scheduled cargo services on behalf of DHL Express from Auckland to Sydney and return. These services operate on Monday - Thursday nights and on Saturdays during daylight hours. It also has approval to operate services to Nouméa and Melbourne (the airline flew scheduled once-weekly services between Auckland and Nouméa's La Tontouta International Airport on behalf of Aircalin until late 2002). A significant part of the airline's business is the carriage of racehorses across the Tasman Sea.

On 1 June 2021, the airline launched flights between Singapore and Melbourne via Darwin.

Fleet

Current fleet
As of October 2022, the Tasman Cargo Airlines fleet consists of the following aircraft:

Former fleet
The airline previously operated the following aircraft:
 Boeing 727-100F
 Boeing 727-200F
 Boeing 757-200PCF

See also
List of airlines of Australia

References

External links

Airlines established in 1994
Cargo airlines of Australia
1994 establishments in Australia